Sonya Walger (born 6 June 1974) is a British actress who also holds American citizenship. She had starring roles in the short-lived sitcoms The Mind of the Married Man (2001–2002) and Coupling (2003) before landing her role as Penny Widmore in the ABC drama series Lost (2006–2010).  Walger later starred on Tell Me You Love Me (2007), FlashForward (2009–2010), Common Law (2012), The Catch (2016–2017) and For All Mankind (2019–2022).

Early life
Walger was born in Hampstead, London. She was educated at the independent Wycombe Abbey School and at Christ Church, Oxford, where she studied English Literature, receiving a first class degree. Walger is conversational in French and fluent in Spanish, as her father was Argentinian.

Career

Walger began her career on British television. In 1998, she guest-starred in an episode of ITV crime series, Midsomer Murders. She had the recurring role in the BBC 1 sitcom Goodnight Sweetheart in 1999, and appeared in two episodes of the crime/drama The Vice. Also in 1999, she played the daughter of newspaper magnate Max Van der Vuurst, Hilde, in the Heat of the Sun story "The Sport of Kings".  The following year, Walger made her film debut in the biographical drama Eisenstein. In 2001, she moved to the United States and was cast as Donna Barnes on the HBO comedy series, The Mind of the Married Man. The series was cancelled after two seasons. In 2003, she starred on the short-lived U.S. version of Coupling, which aired on NBC. In 2004, Walger played Nicole Noone opposite Noah Wyle in the TNT television film, The Librarian: Quest for the Spear, for which she received Saturn Award for Best Supporting Actress on Television nomination.

From 2006 to 2010,  Walger had a recurring role as Penny Widmore in the ABC drama series, Lost. She also had recurring roles on Sleeper Cell, CSI: NY,  and Terminator: The Sarah Connor Chronicles. In 2007, Walger appeared in the original Broadway production of Frost/Nixon, as Charlotte Cushing, David Frost's then-girlfriend. Then she starred in the controversial HBO series Tell Me You Love Me. The series gained notoriety even before the first episode had aired because of the frequency and extremely realistic nature of its sex scenes. Despite persistent rumours to the contrary, these scenes were eventually confirmed as simulated by several individuals intimately connected with the show. With reference to the manual masturbation apparently performed by Walger on actor Adam Scott at the end of the pilot episode, director Patricia Rozema and Walger's co-stars Ally Walker and Jane Alexander also explicitly denied that any actual sex took place on set. The series was canceled after a single season.

From 2009 to 2010, Walger starred as Olivia Benford, a surgeon and wife of FBI agent Mark Benford (Joseph Fiennes) in the ABC series, FlashForward. Later in 2010, she appeared as Julia in season 3 of the HBO drama series In Treatment. She played John Cusack's wife in the 2011 Direct-to-video crime thriller The Factory. In 2012, she was regular cast member in the USA Network short lived series Common Law. In 2013, Walger had a brief role in the comedy film Admission, as a Virginia Woolf scholar. From 2013 to 2014, Walger appeared on the NBC drama series Parenthood.

In 2014, Walger guest-starred in Shonda Rhimes' series Scandal as Katherine Winslow. The following year, Walger was cast in the new Rhimes series The Catch, co-starring opposite Mireille Enos and Peter Krause.

In 2019, Walger starred as NASA astronaut Molly Cobb in the first season of the Apple TV+ original science fiction space drama series For All Mankind. In 2021 and 2022, Walger returned for seasons two and three.

Personal life
Walger married screenwriter/producer Davey Holmes in July 2009. She gave birth to a daughter Billie Rosie Holmes on 14 February 2013. She also gave birth to a son Jake in 2015. Walger became a U.S. citizen on 23 May 2013.

Filmography

Film

Television

References

External links

Living people
1974 births
21st-century English actresses
Actresses from London
Alumni of Christ Church, Oxford
British actors of Latin American descent
English emigrants to the United States
English people of Argentine descent
English television actresses
People educated at Wycombe Abbey
American television actresses
21st-century American women